The Rose Flower Cup is a large silver-gilt communal drinking vessel, with two handles and a detached lid, holding six litres and weighting almost , presented to the later King Christian IV of Denmark at his christening in 1577 by his godfather Hans Skovgaard and his wife Anne Parsberg. The name refers to a verse inscribed on the exterior of the vessel. It is now in the collection of the National Museum of Denmark.

History
 

Hans Skovgaard (15261580), one of King Frederick II's favourites, served as secretary of the Danish Chancellery and was generously rewarded with royal fiefs. In 1573, one year before marrying Anne Parsberg (15491582), against the wishes of the king, he retired from the royal court to his estate Gunderstrup in Scania. Frederick II nonetheless hosted his wedding at Copenhagen Castle and as a wedding present gave him a richly decorated silver tankard.

When Frederik II and Queen Sophie of Mecklenburg-Güstrow had their first son, Christian (1577–1648), who would later succeed his father as Christian IV in 1588, Skovgaard was one of the prince's godfathers. At the christening, he and his wife  presented the Queen, on the prince's behalf, with the large Rose Flower Cup. It is the only remaining gift of the godfathers.

It is unclear who made the vessel. Bearing the maker's mark AE conjoined, it is however, somewhat cautiously, attributed to Royal Goldsmith and armour maker Aelisaeus Englander.

Design

The Rose Flower Cup, which holds six litres (eight s) and has a weight of almost six kilos, is designed in the form of a generous barrel with two handles. Compared to normal tankards, its second handle was a necessity due to its massive size. As is the case with so-called peg tankards, it is fitted on the inside with pegs at regular intervals to mark the quantity each person is supposed to drink. The exterior is decorated with hunting scenes, probably as a reference to Frederick III, who was an enthusiastic huntsman. Hans and Anne Skovgaard's coat of arms is also part of the decoration. A red and white rose has been interpreted as representing the union of the sun and the moon giving birth to the Filius philosophorum. A medallion on the interior of the cover, depicting David playing before King Saul, is most likely  a reference to the recipient (Frederik) and the giver (Skovgaard). The exterior is also inscribed with the year 1577 as well as a verse:

See also 
 Oldenburg Horn

References

Further reading
 Grinder-Hansen, Poul: Aspects of gift giving in Denmark in the sixteenth century and the case of the Rose Flower Cup. Journal of Medieval History, 2011, 37:1, 114-124
 Schoubye, Sigurd: Renæssanceguldsmeden AE, in Kunst og antikvitets årbogen, Thaning & Appels Forlag, Copenhagen, 1970, pp. 89-103
 Grinder-Hansen, Poul: Rosenblommen: en gave, der var en kongesøn værdig, in Nationalmuseets Arbejdsmark Copenhagen, pp. 100-116

External links

 Source
 Source

Collection of the National Museum of Denmark
Christian IV of Denmark
16th-century sculptures
1577 in Denmark
Renaissance sculptures
Silver-gilt objects
Artworks in metal
1577 works
Material culture of royal courts